Domine Eduard Osok Airport  is an airport in Sorong, Southwest Papua, Indonesia. It is one of the largest and busiest airports on the Bird's Head Peninsula. It replaced a smaller, former World War II airfield, Jefman Airport on the island of Jefman. The airport is named after Domine Eduard Osok, a pastor originating from Sorong and known for doing missionary works and spreading Christianity in Sorong and the surrounding parts.

Domine Eduard Osok Airport serves as an entry point to the Raja Ampat Islands, since the Raja Ampat Islands are closer to the city of Sorong than to the provincial capital Manokwari. However, Marinda Airport which is located within the Raja Ampat Islands has started operating, therefore this airport no longer serves as the main entry point.

The movement of aircraft in one of the busiest and largest airports on the Bird's Head Peninsula is experiencing an average growth of 3.3% annually. Noted, there are more than 9,000 aircraft movements per year. In terms of passengers, the average annual passenger growth reaches 13.2% where in 2014 there are about 500,000 more passengers. For cargo, the average cargo growth per year is quite rapid at around 17.2%.

As an airport feeder, Domine Eduard Osok Airport serves domestic scheduled services operated by several airlines including Garuda Indonesia, Sriwijaya Air and Xpress Air. In addition, the airport also serves pioneer destinations which are operated by Susi Air to some surrounding areas such as Ayawasi, Inawatan, Teminabuan, and Waisai. With a length of 2,500 meters and 45 meters wide, this airport runway can be landed by aircraft like Boeing 737 series and the Airbus A320.

History 
Until 2004, Jefman Airport served as the main airport of Sorong. However, that airport was suffering from overcapacity and could not be expanded due to lack of land. Moreover, due to only having a single 1,650 m runway, the airport could only accommodate small aircraft such as the Fokker 28. Furthermore, to go to Sorong, passengers still needed to travel by boat from the airport which was very time-consuming. To solve this issue, the government decided to build a new airport to replace the obsolete Jefman Airport. Construction was finished in 2004 and Jefman Airport is now closed.

In August 2019, the airport was damaged by violent protesters following large-scale protests in Papua.

Development 
In 2013, the Directorate General of Civil Aviation allocated IDR 50 billion ($5.1 million) for runway width expansion to 45 meters from the 0 meters. Due to overcapacity, the government has lengthened the runway to 2,500 m from 1,950 m so that the airport can accommodate Boeing 737 and Airbus A320.  Expansion of the airport commenced from 2011 and finished in 2016. The expansion included construction of passenger terminal building into 2 floors, installation of two new jet bridge and fixed bridge, baggage handling system, terminal lift, luggage x-ray and multi view cabin, walk through metal detector, and addition of other facilities such as concession area and interior terminal design update.  In that period, the total APBN budget used was about 236 billion rupiah. With the airport built more modern and magnificent, it is expected that air transportation services in the city of Sorong and surrounding areas are increasing. That way, Domine Eduard Osok  airport as the gateway of Sorong city can become a booster for Eastern Indonesia to continue growing. The new terminal was inaugurated by President Joko Widodo and Transportation Minister Ignatius Jonan,

On the other side, the navigation facility will be improved in the future. AirNav Sorong also seeks to optimize the instrument landing system (ILS) to assist the landing. This would allow aircraft to land at the airport with ease and also allow the airport to serve night flights. AirNav Sorong is also currently installing a billing data system (BDS) and a billing cash system (BCS). The renovation of the air traffic control tower that was damaged due to an earthquake will also be part of the improvement of the airport's navigation system.

After the renovation, Domine Eduard Osok Airport is currently the second-largest airport in Indonesian Papua, after Sentani International Airport in Jayapura.

Facility 
The exterior of the passenger terminal displays a unique form of ornamentation resembling betel nuts. The architecture design of Domine Eduard Osok Airport is designed to reflect the local culture. In addition, the interior has also been enhanced and equipped with facilities that add passenger comfort. With a passenger terminal building expanded to 13,700 m2, the airport can accommodate 782 passengers daily.

Airlines and destinations

Passenger

References

External links
Domine Eduard Osok Airport - Indonesia Airport Global Website

Sorong
Airports in Southwest Papua